William John Castagna (June 25, 1924 – December 18, 2020) was a United States district judge of the United States District Court for the Middle District of Florida.

Education and career
Born in Philadelphia, Pennsylvania, Castagna served in the United States Air Force from 1943 to 1945. He received his Bachelor of Laws from the Fredric G. Levin College of Law at the University of Florida in 1949 and a Juris Doctor from the same institution in 1967. He was in private practice in Miami, Florida from 1949 to 1950 and in Clearwater from 1950 to 1979.

Federal judicial service

United States President Jimmy Carter nominated Castagna to the United States District Court for the Middle District of Florida on June 5, 1979, to a new seat created by 92 Stat. 1629. Confirmed by the Senate on July 23, 1979, and received commission a day later. Castagna assumed senior status on June 29, 1992. He died on December 18, 2020 at the age of 96.

References

External links
 

1924 births
2020 deaths
21st-century American judges
20th-century American judges
Fredric G. Levin College of Law alumni
Judges of the United States District Court for the Middle District of Florida
Lawyers from Miami
Lawyers from Philadelphia
Military personnel from Philadelphia
United States district court judges appointed by Jimmy Carter